Čelovnik is a dispersed settlement in the hills north of Loka pri Zidanem Mostu in the Municipality of Sevnica in central Slovenia. The area is part of the historical region of Styria. The municipality is now included in the Lower Sava Statistical Region. 

The local church is dedicated to the Holy Spirit and belongs to the Parish of Loka pri Zidanem Mostu. It dates to the 14th century.

References

External links
Čelovnik at Geopedia

Populated places in the Municipality of Sevnica